Eustrophus is a genus of polypore fungus beetles in the family Tetratomidae. There are at least two described species in Eustrophus.

Species
These two species belong to the genus Eustrophus:
 Eustrophus dermestoides (Fabricius, 1792)
 Eustrophus tomentosus Say, 1827

References

Further reading

External links

 

Tenebrionoidea
Articles created by Qbugbot